Wioletta Frankiewicz (née Janowska) (born 9 June 1977 in Piotrków Trybunalski) is a Polish runner.  She competes in the 1500 metres, but she competes also in the 3000 metre steeplechase event, as she did in the 10th IAAF World Championships in Athletics in Helsinki, Finland.  She weighs 58 kilograms and is 1.77 metres tall. She won National Indoor Championships in 2003 (800 m).  She also won the National outdoor championships in 2004 (5000 m) and in 2005 (1500 m).

She won the bronze medal in the inaugural 3000 m steeplechase for women at the 2006 European Athletics Championships in Gothenburg.

Achievements

Personal bests
 800 metres: 2:06.86
 1000 metres: 2:36.97
 1500 metres: 4:03.09
 3000 metres: 8:44.22
 5000 metres: 15:08.38
 10000 metres: 32:16.27
 15 kilometres: 51:29
 3000 m steeplechase: 9:17.15

See also
 Polish records in athletics

External links
 

1977 births
Living people
Polish female steeplechase runners
Polish female long-distance runners
Athletes (track and field) at the 2004 Summer Olympics
Athletes (track and field) at the 2008 Summer Olympics
Olympic athletes of Poland
Sportspeople from Piotrków Trybunalski
European Athletics Championships medalists
20th-century Polish women
21st-century Polish women